Independent Croatia has submitted films for the Academy Award for Best International Feature Film since 1992. The award is handed out annually by the United States Academy of Motion Picture Arts and Sciences to a feature-length motion picture produced outside the United States that contains primarily non-English dialogue. It was not created until the 1956 Academy Awards, in which a competitive Academy Award of Merit, known as the Best Foreign Language Film Award, was introduced for non-English speaking films, and has been given annually since.

Since achieving independence from Yugoslavia, Croatia has submitted 30 films for the Academy Award for Best Foreign Language Film , but none have been nominated for an Oscar. Croatia also unsuccessfully tried to submit a film in 1991 while the country was in the process of achieving international recognition. Since independence, five Croatian directors have had multiple films submitted to the Academy for review. Directors Branko Schmidt, Arsen Anton Ostojić and Zrinko Ogresta had three of their films selected, and two other directors had two films submitted – Vinko Brešan and Dalibor Matanić.

Prior to independence, Croatian actors and filmmakers participated in the Yugoslav film industry and several films made by Croatian filmmakers or produced by Croatian-based film studios were submitted for Oscar consideration representing Yugoslavia. Of these films, two received a nomination: The Road a Year Long directed by Giuseppe De Santis in 1958 (co-produced by Croatian film companies Croatia Film and Jadran Film), and The Ninth Circle directed by France Štiglic in 1960 (produced by Jadran Film).

Submissions
The Academy of Motion Picture Arts and Sciences has invited the film industries of various countries to submit their best film for the Academy Award for Best Foreign Language Film since 1956. The Foreign Language Film Award Committee oversees the process and reviews all the submitted films. Following this, they vote via secret ballot to determine five nominees for the award.

According to Academy rules, the selection of each country's official submission has to be made by "one organization, jury or committee that should include artists and/or craftspeople from the field of motion pictures". In Croatia's case the selection committee and procedure are organized by the Film Artists' Association of Croatia (Hrvatsko društvo filmskih djelatnika or HDFD). Film producers and directors can submit a film for consideration to HDFD, which verifies the completeness of the application and compliance with Academy rules. According to the latest revision of the HDFD criteria in 2007, these include that the film must have had its cinema release between 1 October and 30 September in the preceding year and that the application enclosed must contain a written statement confirming that all financial obligations to performers and craftspeople involved with the film's production have been fulfilled. A 17-member committee composed of HDFD members then proceeds to vote for nominated films in a secret ballot.

Below is a list of the films that have been submitted by Croatia for review by the Academy by year and the respective Academy Awards ceremony.

See also
List of Yugoslav submissions for the Academy Award for Best International Feature Film
List of Academy Award winners and nominees for Best Foreign Language Film
List of Academy Award-winning foreign language films
Cinema of Croatia

Notes

References

External links
The Official Academy Awards Database
IMDb Academy Awards Page
Film Artists' Association of Croatia official website 

Croatia
Academy Award Submissions